Maxime Lajoie (born November 5, 1997) is a Canadian professional ice hockey player currently with the Chicago Wolves in the American Hockey League (AHL) as a prospect to the Carolina Hurricanes of the National Hockey League (NHL). Lajoie was chosen 133rd overall by the Ottawa Senators in the 2016 NHL Entry Draft.

Early life
Lajoie was born in Quebec City and moved to Montreal, Quebec, Toronto, Ontario and then Calgary, Alberta by the age of seven. His first language is French but is now bilingual.

Playing career
Lajoie played major junior hockey for the Swift Current Broncos of the Western Hockey League (WHL) from 2013 to 2017. He was drafted by the Broncos, 95th overall, in the 2012 WHL Bantam Draft. Lajoie played one game in 2013–14 and earned a roster spot in 2014–15. He increased his points per game over his three seasons with the Broncos and was selected by the Ottawa Senators in his first season of eligibility, going 133rd overall in the 2016 NHL Entry Draft. Lajoie's coach until 2016, former Senator Mark Lamb, considered the selection of Lajoie a "steal" at 133rd overall, noting he was the team's No. 1 penalty killer, No. 1 shut-down defenceman and assistant captain.

Lajoie signed a three-year, entry level contract with the Senators on October 3, 2016, and attended their training camp, before returning to the Swift Current Broncos as an alternate captain for one final season in junior.

In 2017, he became a professional, joining the Belleville Senators of the American Hockey League in September 2017. In November 2017, Lajoie was assigned to the Brampton Beast of the ECHL, returning to Belleville after one game at Brampton. In 2018, Lajoie made the jump to the NHL, earning a roster spot in training camp. He made his NHL debut on October 4, 2018, scoring a goal and an assist in a 4–3 overtime loss to the Chicago Blackhawks. Lajoie became the second Ottawa defenceman (after Wade Redden) to score in his NHL debut.

After attending the Senators training camp for the delayed 2020–21 season, on January 12, 2021, Lajoie was traded by Ottawa to the Carolina Hurricanes in exchange for Clark Bishop. He was directly assigned by the Hurricanes to join AHL affiliate, the Chicago Wolves. On August 6, 2022 the Hurricanes re-signed Lajoie's to an additional one-year contract.

Career statistics

Awards and honours

References

External links
 

1997 births
Living people
Belleville Senators players
Brampton Beast players
Canadian ice hockey defencemen
Carolina Hurricanes players
Chicago Wolves players
French Quebecers
Ice hockey people from Quebec City
Ottawa Senators draft picks
Ottawa Senators players
Swift Current Broncos players